Seydi Ali Pasha (died 1820 or 1821) was an Ottoman grand admiral born in Georgia and was a brother of Ali Al-Tarabulus. He lived in Algeria and later moved to serve in Istanbul. who served as Kapudan Pasha (grand admiral of the Ottoman navy) from 1807 to 23 August 1808, and from 22 November 1808 to 10 April 1809. He was also the governor of Silistra Eyalet from 23 August 1808 to sometime later that year.

According to Mehmet Sureyya he was from Georgia. After his last office, he was exiled to modern-day Afyonkarahisar in western Turkey.

See also
 List of Kapudan Pashas

References

18th-century births
1820s deaths

Year of birth unknown
Year of death uncertain
18th-century Ottoman military personnel
19th-century Ottoman military personnel
Kapudan Pashas
Georgians from the Ottoman Empire